Graeme Kench (born 23 February 1959) is a New Zealand cricketer. He played in one List A match for Canterbury in 1982/83.

See also
 List of Canterbury representative cricketers

References

External links
 

1959 births
Living people
New Zealand cricketers
Canterbury cricketers
Cricketers from Christchurch